Goßler is a surname of:

 Anna Henriette Gossler (1771-1836), German banker, heiress and socialite
 Carl Goßler (1885–1914), German rower
 Cornelius Freiherr von Berenberg-Gossler (1874–1953), German banker
 Gustav Goßler (1879–1940), German rower
 Gustav von Goßler (1838–1902), German politician
 Heinrich von Gossler (1841–1927), Prussian general
 Hermann Goßler (1802–1877), German jurist and politician, mayor of Hamburg
 Johann Hinrich Gossler (1738-1790), German banker 
 John von Berenberg-Gossler (1866-1943), German banker and politician
 Oskar Goßler (1875–1953), German rower
 Stefan Gossler (born 1955), German actor

See also 
 Gossler family
 Gossler Islands
 Gossler's Park

Surnames
Surnames of German origin